Heerhugowaard (West Frisian Dutch: Heerhugoweard, Heregeweard or De Weard) is a city in the Netherlands, in the province of North Holland and the region of West Friesland.

Heerhugowaard was previously a municipality, which merged with the former municipality of Langedijk into the new municipality of Dijk en Waard on 1 January 2022.

History 
Around the year 800, the area of the modern municipality of Heerhugowaard was covered in peat fen. Because of peat-digging and storm floods many lakes developed in the region, including the Heerhugowaard. The name is derived from lord ('heer' in Dutch) Hugo van Assendelft who was killed by the West Frisians in this area in 1296. After two storms in 1248, the abbey of Egmond, which had much property in this region, built the Schagerdam at Schagen. This became part of the Westfriese Omringdijk, which protected the pentagon Schagen - Alkmaar - Medemblik - Enkhuizen - Hoorn.

Uncontrollable increase of the lake had been prevented. In the 17th century private investors decided to drain the lake to create farmland. In contrast to e.g. the Beemster, the quality of the new land was very disappointing. In 1674 there was even a serious proposal to refill the polder with water, reasoning that the area would be more profitable as fishing water.

A major event in the recent history of Heerhugowaard was the unexpected victory of Princess Margriet at the first-ever held Keegelfestival of 1961. This bowling festival was an annual event until 1984, when the organising bowling club declared bankruptcy due to financial mismanagement.

Geography 
Heerhugowaard is part of the province of North-Holland and is located in the west of the Netherlands. The land reclamation of Heerhugowaard is situated 3 metres under sea level. The surrounding land is flat as it is formed of large polders. To the southwest of the city lies Alkmaar.

Topography 

Map of Heerhugowaard (town), 2014.

Climate 
Heerhugowaard has a cool oceanic climate (Köppen climate classification Cfb), strongly influenced by its proximity to the North Sea to the west, with prevailing north-western winds and gales. Winter temperatures are cool to mild. Heerhugowaard, as well as most of North-Holland province, lies in USDA Hardiness zone 9, the northernmost such occurrence in continental Europe. Frosts mainly occur during spells of easterly or northeasterly winds from the inner European continent, from Scandinavia, Russia, or even Siberia. Even then, because Heerhugowaard is surrounded on three sides by large bodies of water, as well as enjoying a significant heat island effect, nights rarely fall below . Summers are moderately warm but rarely hot. Days with measurable precipitation are common, on average 189 days per year. Nevertheless, Heerhugowaard's average annual precipitation is only . Most of this precipitation is in the form of protracted drizzle or light rain, making cloudy and damp days common during the cooler months of October through March. Only the occasional European windstorm brings significant rain in a short period of time, requiring it to be pumped out to higher ground or to the seas around the city.

Cityscape

Population centres 
The former municipality of Heerhugowaard consisted of the following towns, villages and/or districts: Broekhorn, Butterhuizen, De Noord, Draai, Frik, Kabel, 't Kruis, Veenhuizen, Verlaat, Oostertocht, Bomenwijk, Schilderswijk, Rivierenwijk, Edelstenenwijk, Stad van de Zon.

Building 
In the course of time the population has grown. In 1960, Heerhugowaard had 6,800 inhabitants; this number became 25,000 in 1975, 47,239 in 2004 and 48,267 in 2005. In May 2007, Heerhugowaard welcomed its 50,000th inhabitant. Currently, Heerhugowaard has approximately 55,000 inhabitants. For several years in the 1970s, Heerhugowaard was the fastest growing municipality in the Netherlands. It is intended that Heerhugowaard eventually will have at least 60,000 inhabitants. The general expectation is that around 2050, Heerhugowaard will be the size of the nearby located City of Alkmaar, and will have approximately 100,000 inhabitants. There are problems with retaining the youth however, so that this number might never be reached. As young people leave their parents' homes, they prefer to move to other places such as Alkmaar or Amsterdam. The major part of the inhabitants lives in so-called Vinex-districts. The rural core of the North lies in the Middenwaard. The core of the south is at Stationsweg by the old church. In the polders there are small hamlets. The greater part of the town is new developments. The best rural core is in the villages of Centrumwaard and De Noord. Heerhugowaard has a small shopping area in Centrumwaard, and a large shopping centre in the district of Middenwaard. There is a cinema. Since 2004 there has been a coffee shop in Heerhugowaard. This coffee shop however, has met with fierce opposition from some of the local population, who have bombarded the coffee shop with stones several times. The other part realizes this establishment is there to make sure the laws are respected (e.g. no sales to 18- ) and to make sure there is no cross pollination between soft and hard drugs. Heerhugowaard has a number of subdivisions which were set up the same as in Almere, for example the writer district, the tree district, the planet district, and the nature area of Butterhuizen. In two of the newest districts, called Stad van de Zon I and II (= City of the Sun I and II) the energy supplies for a considerable part comes from solar energy.

Parks 
The surroundings of Heerhugowaard are quite varied and beautiful. Not far from Heerhugowaard you will find several landscapes. East of the agglomeration there are different kinds of flower bulb fields. In the mid-1980s, 61 hectares of woodland were planted, the "Waarderhout". Of course you will also find much farmland in the region of Heerhugowaard.

Shopping centre 
One shopping centre in Heerhugowaard is Middenwaard, owned by real estate investment company Wereldhave. Middenwaard was built in five phases. Construction began in 1974, while the last phase was completed in 2008. Because of this phased development, the shopping centre has an odd external and internal appearance. Meanwhile, Middenwaard has been renovated and has an unambiguous appearance nowadays.

Middenwaard offers a large variety in stores and services, including:

Transport 
Heerhugowaard has good connections with the neighbouring places. Buses go to and from Alkmaar, Bergen NH, Broek Op Langedijk and Ursem. Also Heerhugowaard has Interliner links. Heerhugowaard railway station is on the railway routes to Hoorn and Den Helder, Alkmaar - Amsterdam - Nijmegen, and Alkmaar - Haarlem - The Hague. Heerhugowaard is on the N242, the N508 and the N507 road.

Government 
The former municipal council of Heerhugowaard consisted of 31 seats, which were divided as follows:

''* = separation of Burgerbelang

Sister cities 
Heerhugowaard has one sister city:

Notable people 
 Theodorus Dekker (born 1927) a Dutch mathematician who developed Dekker's algorithm

Sport 
 Rudi Lubbers (born 1945) a retired Dutch boxer who competed at the 1964 and 1968 Summer Olympics
 Monique van der Lee (born 1973) a former Dutch judoka, competed at the 1992 Summer Olympics
 Anousjka van Exel (born 1974) a Dutch former tennis player
 Arvid Smit (born 1980) a football coach and former professional footballer with 224 club caps
 Stefanie van der Gragt (born 1992) a Dutch footballer
 Tess Wester (born 1993) a Dutch handballer who plays as goalkeeper for Odense Håndbold and the Dutch national team

Further reading 
 Groenedijk, T. (2000). Nederlandse plaatsnamen. Slingenberg Boekproducties, Hoogeveen, Netherlands, 2000.
 Van de Ven, G. (redactie) (1996) Leefbaar laagland (4th, revised printing). Uitgeverij Matrijs. p. 33-35, 57 en 131–136.
 Statistics are taken from the SDU Staatscourant
 Overview of city council seats (2009) taken from the municipality of Heerhugowaard

Gallery

References

External links 
 
 Official website

Former municipalities of North Holland
Populated places in North Holland
Polders of North Holland
Municipalities of the Netherlands disestablished in 2022